Morganville is an unincorporated community and census-designated place (CDP) within Marlboro Township, in Monmouth County, New Jersey. As of the 2010 United States Census, the CDP's population was 5,040.

Morganville has its own post office, with a ZIP code of 07751.

Geography

According to the United States Census Bureau, Morganville had a total area of 5.429 square miles (14.061 km2), including 5.423 square miles (14.045 km2) of land and 0.006 square miles (0.016 km2) of water (0.11%).

Demographics

Census 2010

Based on data from the Census Bureau's 2010-2014 American Community Survey, the median income for a household in the CDP was $119,215, and the median income for a family was $126,213. Males had a median income of $126,208 versus $62,326 for females. The per capita income for the CDP was $50,942. About 0.9% of families and 0.7% of the population were below the poverty line, including 0.8% of those under age 18 and 0.0% of those age 65 or over.

Census 2000
As of the 2000 United States Census there were 11,255 people, 3,642 households, and 3,270 families living in the CDP. The population density was 1,892.0 people per square mile (730.3/km2). There were 3,723 housing units at an average density of 625.8/sq mi (241.6/km2). The racial makeup of the CDP was 87.27% White, 1.71% African American, 0.01% Native American, 9.76% Asian, 0.04% Pacific Islander, 0.50% from other races, and 0.71% from two or more races. Hispanic or Latino of any race were 2.94% of the population.

There were 3,642 households, out of which 45.0% had children under the age of 18 living with them, 82.1% were married couples living together, 6.2% had a female householder with no husband present, and 10.2% were non-families. 8.9% of all households were made up of individuals, and 4.2% had someone living alone who was 65 years of age or older. The average household size was 3.09 and the average family size was 3.29.

In the CDP the population was spread out, with 27.9% under the age of 18, 5.9% from 18 to 24, 26.0% from 25 to 44, 32.2% from 45 to 64, and 8.1% who were 65 years of age or older. The median age was 40 years. For every 100 females, there were 95.3 males. For every 100 females age 18 and over, there were 91.4 males.

The median income for a household in the CDP was $99,035, and the median income for a family was $107,081. Males had a median income of $75,067 versus $41,861 for females. The per capita income for the CDP was $39,802. About 1.3% of families and 1.7% of the population were below the poverty line, including 1.1% of those under age 18 and 0.8% of those age 65 or over.

Transportation
New Jersey Transit offers bus service to the Port Authority Bus Terminal in Midtown Manhattan on route 139.

Education
As Morganville is located in Marlboro Township, students in public school are served by the Marlboro Township Public School District. Children in Morganville attend Robertsville Elementary School, Frank Defino Elementary School, and Asher Holmes Elementary School.

Wineries
 Peppadew Fresh Vineyards

Notable people

People who were born in, residents of, or otherwise closely associated with Morganville include:
 Monica Aksamit (born 1990), saber fencer who won a bronze medal at the 2016 Summer Olympics in the Women's Saber Team competition.
 Jeff Feuerzeig (born 1964), film screenwriter and director.
 Elmer H. Geran (1875-1954), politician who represented New Jersey's 3rd congressional district from 1923 to 1925.
 Ellen Karcher (born 1964), member of the New Jersey Senate from 2004 to 2008.
 Akash Modi (born 1995), artistic gymnast who represented the United States at the 2018 World Artistic Gymnastics Championships.

References

Census-designated places in Monmouth County, New Jersey
Marlboro Township, New Jersey